Kemp Town railway station was the terminus station of the Kemp Town branch line, a short branch line serving the Kemptown district of Brighton, England.

The branch line opened in 1869, running from a junction off the Brighton to Lewes line between London Road and Moulsecoomb stations. It was expensive to construct, requiring a tunnel and a large viaduct.

The passenger service declined after 1917 due to tramway competition, and ceased at the end of 1932, but goods trains continued to operate on the line until 1971.

Opening
The Kemp Town branch line opened to traffic on 2 August 1869. There was a formal ceremonial opening on 6 August.

Although the line was constructed as a single line, and the terminus had only one platform, extensive land was acquired around the Kemp Town terminus for future development. During the 1870s, the goods yard was extended.

Development
In 1923 the LBSCR was made a constituent of the new Southern Railway following the Railways Act 1921. The Southern Railway decided to withdraw the passenger service on the line and the last passenger trains ran on 31 December 1932.

After passenger closure
The signal boxes at Kemp Town and Lewes Road were decommissioned and "one engine in steam" working was instituted on the line for the one or two daily goods trains; this arrangement started on 29 July 1933. There was an occasional Sunday School special excursion and enthusiasts specials on the line after passenger closure.

The branch continued in use for goods purposes, and British Railways found it convenient to use Kemp Town goods station as a relief to the congested main goods depot of Brighton. A special passenger train service ran on 26 June 1971.The line finally closed on 14 August 1971.

Accidents and incidents
Two incidents where trains ran into the buffer stops at the end of the line in the station:
 On 9 July 1902, a passenger train ran into the buffer stops. There were no fatalities, but several passengers reported they had been injured. Otherwise, little damage occurred. The driver afterwards asserted that the brakes were faulty, but others reported that the brakes were in good working order. The official report concluded that the driver had failed to take into account the longer-than-usual length of the train (engine hauling 11 vehicles) and hence its heavier weight would require greater braking being applied.
 On 8 January 1963, during an unusually cold winter, a freight train slid on iced-up rails through the buffer stops and into the station office. Two office staff escaped injury because they happened not to be in it at the time.

Land use since closure 

The site of Kemp Town station has been redeveloped as the Freshfield Industrial Estate. The only remaining evidence of a station is the portal of the railway tunnel to the north. This can be seen from the compound of a self-storage warehouse.

See also 
 List of closed railway stations in Britain
 Transport in Brighton and Hove

References 
Citations

Sources

Further reading
 Douglas d'Enno, East Brighton and Ovingdean Through Time, Amberley Publishing, Stroud, 2010, 

Disused railway stations in Brighton and Hove
Former London, Brighton and South Coast Railway stations
Railway stations in Great Britain opened in 1869
Railway stations in Great Britain closed in 1917
Railway stations in Great Britain opened in 1919
Railway stations in Great Britain closed in 1933
1869 establishments in England